Denys Molchanov and Aleksandr Nedovyesov were the defending champions but chose not to defend their title.

Sriram Balaji and Jeevan Nedunchezhiyan won the title after defeating Vladyslav Manafov and Oleg Prihodko 7–6(8–6), 6–4 in the final.

Seeds

Draw

References

External links
 Main draw

Bratislava Open - Doubles